
Gmina Konarzyny is a rural gmina (administrative district) in Chojnice County, Pomeranian Voivodeship, in northern Poland.

Villages
Gmina Konarzyny contains the villages and settlements of Binduga, Borne, Boryń, Ciecholewy, Duża Kępina, Dzięgiel, Jaranty, Jonki, Kępinka, Kiełpin, Konarzynki, Konarzyny, Korne, Niepszczołąg, Nierostowo, Nowa Karczma, Nowa Parszczenica, Parszczenica, Popielewo, Pustkowie, Rowista, Zielona Chocina, Zielona Huta, Złota Góra, Żychce and Żychckie Osady.

Neighbouring gminas
Gmina Konarzyny is bordered by the gminas of Chojnice, Człuchów, Lipnica and Przechlewo.

References
Polish official population figures 2006

Konarzyny
Chojnice County